Harsheel Dani (born 12 August 1996) is an Indian badminton player. He represented India in the Asian and BWF World Junior Championships. He also became the U-19 singles champion in the junior nationals. Currently training at the Uday Pawar Academy in Mumbai under Indian Coach Uday Pawar, he aims to compete at various international tournaments in order to transition smoothly to the senior circuit and is receiving support from the GoSports Foundation.

Background 
He attended Thakur College in Kandivali for his undergraduate education.

Career 
In 2012 he won the second Karvy All India junior-ranking badminton tournament.

He was the runner-up of the 2015 Turkey International.

At the 2016 Syed Modi International Grand Prix Gold, he reached the quarterfinal.

He was the semi-finalist at the Austrian Open in February 2016.

Harsheel is part of the national training camp at the Pullela Gopichand Academy in Hyderabad, and has left with the team to compete at the Canada Open.

In the 2016 Premier Badminton League, he represented Mumbai Masters.

Achievements

BWF International Challenge/Series 
Men's singles

  BWF International Challenge tournament
  BWF International Series tournament
  BWF Future Series tournament

References

External links 
 

Indian male badminton players
1996 births
Living people